OQ, formerly known as Oman Oil Company, is an energy investment company headquartered in Muscat, Oman. It is a wholly owned subsidiary of the Government of Oman through the Oman Investment Authority.

OQ is involved in sectors such as infrastructure and transportation for energy, oil refining, petrochemical production, oil marketing, and power generating. It operates in 17 different countries.

As of June 2022, OQ produces more than 218,000 barrels of oil per day.

History

1982 to 2000
OQ was founded as the Oman Refinery Company in 1982.

In 1996, Oman Oil Company was established by the Government of Oman.

A separate company for gas, named Oman Gas Company, was established in 2000.

2002 to 2010
In 2003, Oman Oil Marketing Company (Oman Oil) was founded.

Oman Trading International, a trading division, was established in 2006.

Oman Refineries and Petrochemicals Co. was created in 2007 with the merger of Oman Refinery Company and Sohar Refinery Company.

In 2009, Oman Oil Company Exploration & Production was founded.

In 2010, the Programme Apple was initiated which aimed to integrate Oman Refineries and Petrochemicals Company, Oman Polypropylene Co., and Aromatics Oman Ltd. In the same year, Oman Oil Company signed a joint-venture with JBF Industries to erect a Terephthalic acid-PTA plant.

2011 to 2020
Following the initial phase of integration, Orpic was founded in 2011.

In 2013, OQ acquired a German-based company, OXEA. OOC signed an exploration and production agreement with BP in 2013, to further develop the Khazzan-Makarem gas field.

In 2014, construction of the Sohar Refinery Improvement Project started.

In 2016, OOC secured a $4 billion loan to invest into various project over the coming years. In the following year OOC signed a memorandum of understanding with Spains Eni.

In 2017, a joint venture between Kuwait Petroleum International and OQ was announced for the development of Duqm Refinery & Petrochemical Complex. In the same year, OQ's subsidiary, Oman Tank Terminal Company (OTTCO), began construction of a crude oil storage terminal near Raz Markaz.

In 2018, Oman Oil Company sold 10% of its 40% stake in the Khazzan gas field to Malaysia's Petronas and signed two concessions/agreements with Occidental Petroleum (Oxy).

In November 2018, OOC announced that the company will be merged with refining company Orpic, which had been created in 2011 to operate Oman's downstream assets.

The NAKHLA programme was initiated in 2018. The construction of the Duqm Refinery began the same year, as did the groundwork for the Salalah LPG and Salalah Ammonia Projects.

Orpic Group merged with Oman Oil Company in 2019, and the combined business was given the moniker OQ. OQ is an acronym for "Oman" and "Quality".

In August 2020, OQ and the Ministry of Heritage and Tourism collaborated to announce the opening of a tourist centre at the archaeological site in the Wilayat of Al Dibba.

2021 to present
In September 2021, an announcement was made that OQ was considering sale of its German subsidiary, Oxea, a chemicals business, for about $3 billion. OQ Chemicals has two manufacturing sites in Germany that make a range of oxo intermediates and derivatives.
 
In October 2021, OQ, Marubeni Corporation, Linde, and Dutco decided to explore the possibility of producing green ammonia and green hydrogen in Salalah.
 
In December 2021, Liwa Plastics Industries Complex (LPIC) project in Sohar was inaugurated. The work on the project started in May 2020. With two polyethylene facilities, it has the capacity to produce 880,000 tonnes of linear low-density polyethylene (LLDPE) and high-density polyethylene (HDPE) annually.

In December 2021, Saudi Basic Industries Corp (SABIC) and OQ signed a Memorandum of Understanding (MoU) to study the possibility of building a petrochemical project in the Duqm Free Zone.

In May 2022, Trend Micro and OQ inked a Memorandum of Understanding (MOU), under which Trend Micro would secure OQ's digital infrastructure from cyber threats.

In July 2022, OQ signed an agreement with the Ministry of Higher Education, Research, and Innovation to fund the construction of vocational colleges with an allocation of OMR 200,000.

Operations
The OQ is invested into different main sectors through its network of subsidiaries. These include petrochemicals, refining and marketing, metal and mining and services.

OQ Company runs operations via four main subsidiaries:
 Takamul Investment Company S.A.O.C
 Oman India Fertilizer Co. (OMIFCO)
 Oman Oil Refineries and Petroleum Industries Company (ORPIC)
 Salalah Methanol Co. (SMC)
 Minerals Development Oman (MDO)
 Innovation Development Oman Holding (IDO) [Shares transferred to OIA]
 Vale Oman Pelletizing Company (Vale Oman)
 Takatuf Oman 
 Sohar Aluminium Company (SAC)
 Oman Oil Company Exploration and Production
 Oman Oil Facilities Development Company L.L.C
 Oman Oil Duqm Development L.L.C

The companies international assets are under direct control of the OOC, which has an international investment unit. These include:
 OXEA  - Germany (100%) --> Oxea is now OQ Chemicals May 2020
 Blackrock Metals Company – Canada (2.8%)
 MOL – Hungary (7%)
 Redes Energéticas Nacionais (REN) – Portugal (15%)
 Oman Trading International (OTI) – UAE (70%)
 Gulf Energy Maritime (GEM) – UAE (30.4%)
 Orient Power Company Limited (OPCL) – Pakistan (42.8%)
 Planta de Regasification de Sagunto (Saggas) – Spain (7.5%)
 Qingdao Lidong Chemical Ltd. – China (30%)
 GS Electric, Power & Services (GS EPS) – South Korea (30%)
 Qingdao Lixing Logistics – China (30%)
 Bharat Oman Refinery Limited (BORL) – India (26%)
 Compañia Logística de Hidrocaburos S.A (CLH) – Spain (10%)

Divisions

Feed, food, and agriculture
Feed, food and agriculture division, covers areas such as animal nutrition, crop protection, herbicide, pesticide and its handling, and human nutrition.

Flexible and rigid packaging
OQ provides flexible packaging for transportation, retail spaces, and for consumers' cupboards. Some other consumer-facing industry sectors, include cosmetics, electronics, pharmaceuticals, and sporting goods.

OQ provides rigid packing products for food, consumer goods, houseware, electronics and industrial packaging.

Infrastructure and construction
OQ is active in research and development (R&D) of different products. OQ is utilizing its research to develop infrastructure in sectors such as geosynthetics, pipes system, tanks and fittings.

Lubricants and functional fluids
OQ provides carboxylic acids, polyols, synthetic polyol ester base oils, and amines.

Paints and coatings
OQ's n/iso butyl acetate is used in different applications such as automotive, aerospace, concrete and wood finishes, or as nail polish in cosmetics. Another product, TMP, is used for alkyd and polyester coatings resins and for UV curable alkyd resins, while NPG is used in the production of powder coatings for architectural, automotive, appliances, lawn and garden equipment.

Pharmaceutical and medical care
OQ produces biocidal alcohols which are used in hand sanitizers and as a specialty amines.

See also

Energy in Oman

References

External links
 

Non-renewable resource companies established in 1982
Oil and gas companies of Oman
National oil and gas companies
Companies based in Muscat, Oman